Panjim Footballers Club, or simply known as Panjim Footballers, is an Indian professional football club based in Panjim, Goa, that competes in the Goa Professional League. It's women's team previously participated in the Indian Women's League, and currently participates in GFA Vedanta Women's League.

History 
Established in 1978 as an small city club, Panjim Footballers started playing in inter-village tournaments and GFA age-group tournaments and won many small tournaments.

In 2021, Panjim Footballers won Goa Police Cup, their only major tournament since their inception in 1978. They defeated Dempo SC 1–0 at Duler Stadium in the final.

Honours

League
GFA Third Division
 Champions (1): 2013

Cup 

 Goa Police Cup
 Champions (1): 2021

Women's team
Goa Women's League
Champions (1): 2017, 2018

References

External links 
Panjim Footballers at Soccerway
Panjim Footballers at Sofascore
Panjim Footballers at the-aiff.com (AIFF)

1976 establishments in India
Football clubs in Goa
Association football clubs established in 1976